William L. Proctor (born January 27, 1933) is an American politician and university administrator.  Proctor served as president of Flagler College in St. Augustine, Florida between 1971 and 2001. In addition, he has served on Florida's State Board of Education, as a state representative for the Florida Legislature, as a St. Augustine city commissioner, as a chairman of the Independent Colleges and Universities of Florida association, as a member of the board of trustees of the Florida School for the Deaf and Blind and as a vice-chairman of the Florida Education Standards Commission. He is the former Chancellor of Flagler College.

Early life, education, and political career 
Proctor was born in Atlanta, Georgia in 1933, and moved to Florida in 1944. Proctor attended the University of Florida, Stetson University, and Florida State University. He received a bachelor's degree (1956),  master's degree (1964) and doctorate (1968) from Florida State University.  In addition, Proctor served in the United States Army Reserve from 1954 through 1964.

Proctor was elected to the Florida House of Representatives in 2004 and subsequently reelected, representing Florida's 20th District.

Florida State 
Proctor played college football at Florida State University in 1955 and was selected in the 1955 NFL Draft by the Cleveland Browns, in the 20th round, although he never played professionally. He was inducted into Florida State University's Athletic Hall of Fame in 1988. In 2007, Proctor was named the interim athletic director for the Florida State Seminoles, serving until Randy Spetman was hired as the permanent athletic director in February 2008.

References

External links 
 Florida House of Representatives profile

1933 births
Living people
American football tackles
Heads of universities and colleges in the United States
Florida State Seminoles athletic directors
Florida State Seminoles football players
Republican Party members of the Florida House of Representatives
Stetson University alumni
University of Florida alumni
Players of American football from Atlanta
Players of American football from Florida